Pristobaeus jocosus is a species of spider in the jumping spider family (Salticidae), found in Sulawesi.

References

Salticidae
Spiders of Asia
Spiders described in 1902